Murtaz Daushvili (born 1 May 1989) is a Georgian professional footballer who plays as a defensive midfielder for Cypriot First Division club APOEL and the Georgia national team.

Career
Daushvili made his debut for Georgia on 19 November 2008 against Romania.  As of January 2022, he plays for APOEL.

References

External links
 
 

1989 births
Footballers from Tbilisi
Living people
Footballers from Georgia (country)
Georgia (country) international footballers
Georgia (country) under-21 international footballers
Association football midfielders
FC Zestafoni players
FC Lviv players
FC Karpaty Lviv players
Expatriate footballers from Georgia (country)
Expatriate footballers in Ukraine
Ukrainian Premier League players
Expatriate sportspeople from Georgia (country) in Ukraine
Diósgyőri VTK players
FC Samtredia players
Szombathelyi Haladás footballers
Expatriate footballers in Hungary
Expatriate sportspeople from Georgia (country) in Hungary
Expatriate sportspeople from Georgia (country) in Cyprus
Expatriate footballers in Cyprus
APOEL FC players
Anorthosis Famagusta F.C. players
Cypriot First Division players
Nemzeti Bajnokság I players
Erovnuli Liga players